Montgomery Creek is a census-designated place in Shasta County, California, United States. Its population is 176 as of the 2020 census, up from 163 from the 2010 census. The town and associated creek were named after Zachariah Montgomery.

Geography
Montgomery Creek is located at  (40.840230, -121.919586).

Demographics

2010
The 2010 United States Census reported that Montgomery Creek had a population of 163. The racial makeup of Montgomery Creek was 117 (71.8%) White, 2 (1.2%) African American, 16 (9.8%) Native American, 0 (0.0%) Asian, 0 (0.0%) Pacific Islander, 9 (5.5%) from other races, and 19 (11.7%) from two or more races. Hispanic or Latino of any race were 18 persons (11.0%).

The Census reported that 151 people (92.6% of the population) lived in households, 0 (0%) lived in non-institutionalized group quarters, and 12 (7.4%) were institutionalized.

There were 61 households, out of which 20 (32.8%) had children under the age of 18 living in them, 24 (39.3%) were opposite-sex married couples living together, 10 (16.4%) had a female householder with no husband present, 5 (8.2%) had a male householder with no wife present.  There were 5 (8.2%) unmarried opposite-sex partnerships, and 2 (3.3%) same-sex married couples or partnerships. 17 households (27.9%) were made up of individuals, and 8 (13.1%) had someone living alone who was 65 years of age or older. The average household size was 2.48.  There were 39 families (63.9% of all households); the average family size was 3.05.

The population was spread out, with 48 people (29.4%) under the age of 18, 12 people (7.4%) aged 18 to 24, 30 people (18.4%) aged 25 to 44, 48 people (29.4%) aged 45 to 64, and 25 people (15.3%) who were 65 years of age or older.  The median age was 40.4 years. For every 100 females, there were 109.0 males.  For every 100 females age 18 and over, there were 98.3 males.

There were 69 housing units at an average density of 20.9 per square mile (8.1/km), of which 42 (68.9%) were owner-occupied, and 19 (31.1%) were occupied by renters. The homeowner vacancy rate was 2.3%; the rental vacancy rate was 0%.  93 people (57.1% of the population) lived in owner-occupied housing units and 58 people (35.6%) lived in rental housing units.

2000
As of the census of 2000, there were 96 people, 42 households, and 27 families residing in the CDP. There were 51 housing units at an average density of 15.9 per square mile (6.1/km). The racial makeup of the CDP was 84.38% White, 12.50% Native American, and 3.12% from two or more races. Hispanic or Latino of any race were 2.08% of the population.

There were 42 households, out of which 35.7% had children under the age of 18 living with them, 50.0% were married couples living together, 7.1% had a female householder with no husband present, and 35.7% were non-families. 31.0% of all households were made up of individuals, and 14.3% had someone living alone who was 65 years of age or older. The average household size was 2.29 and the average family size was 2.81.

In the CDP, the population was spread out, with 29.2% under the age of 18, 3.1% from 18 to 24, 21.9% from 25 to 44, 34.4% from 45 to 64, and 11.5% who were 65 years of age or older. The median age was 44 years. For every 100 females, there were 108.7 males. For every 100 females age 18 and over, there were 119.4 males.

The median income for a household in the CDP was $26,250, and the median income for a family was $26,750. Males had a median income of $30,000 versus $0 for females. The per capita income for the CDP was $9,211. There were 29.6% of families and 33.3% of the population living below the poverty line, including 47.2% of under eighteens and none of those over 64.

Politics

History 
In August 1992, the Fountain Fire burned many homes and structures in Montgomery Creek and neighboring Round Mountain. Firefighters were able to save most of the structures in 'downtown' Montgomery Creek.

Famous residents
Actor Craig T. Nelson lived in Montgomery Creek while working as a janitor at Cedar Creek Elementary School.
Christopher Featherston 9/11 Pentagon survivor and Intelligence Analyst at the National Security Council in the White House went to 3rd and 4th grade in Cedar Creek Elementary School.

See also

 List of census-designated places in California

References

External links

 Montgomery Creek's local newsletter

Census-designated places in Shasta County, California
Census-designated places in California